Manuel Patricio Rodríguez García (17 March 1805 – 1 July 1906), was a Spanish singer, music educator, and vocal pedagogue. He invented the first laryngoscope.

Biography
His father was singer and teacher Manuel del Pópulo Vicente Rodriguez García (Manuel García I, 1775–1832). His sisters were Maria Malibran (1808–1836) and Pauline Viardot (1821–1910). After abandoning his onstage career as a baritone, García began to teach at the Paris Conservatory (1830–48) and the Royal Academy of Music, London (1848–95). Jessie Bond, Camille Everardi, Erminia Frezzolini, Julius Günther, Jenny Lind, Mathilde Marchesi, Christina Nilsson, Julia Ettie Crane, Georgina Schubert, Julius Stockhausen, Marie Tempest, Charles Santley and Henry Wood were among his pupils. He invented a laryngoscope in 1854 and the next year published observations of his own larynx and vocal cords made with a small dental mirror introduced into the throat and using sunlight reflected by another mirror. He has been credited with saving the career of Jenny Lind, who had suffered vocal damage from overwork in her early twenties. García was interested in movements connected with the production of the singing voice and did not anticipate the importance of laryngoscopy for medicine. Still, the University of Königsberg conferred upon him the honorary degree of M.D. He died in London in 1906 at the age of 101 years and was buried in the churchyard of St. Edward's Catholic church in Sutton Green, Surrey. His grave gives details of his many famous pupils and accomplishments.

On 22 November 1832 in Paris García married the operatic soprano Cécile Eugénie Mayer (Paris, 8 April 1814 – Paris, 12 August 1880). They had two sons Manuel (1836–1885) Gustave (1837–1925) and two daughters, Eugenie Harouel (1840–1924) and Marie Crèpet (1842–1867). His second son Gustave Garcia (1 February 1837 – 1925) was a singer, actor, and author of three books on vocal and stage techniques. Gustave's son, Albert García (1875–1946), studied voice with his great aunt (Pauline Viardot), became a respected baritone, and produced an edition of his grandfather's treatise on singing (1924).

From second wife Beata Elena Rodriguez (+ 19 April 1917) were born 2 daughters, Paula (+ 1 May 1960) wife from 1901 of Major George McKenzie Franks (1868–1958) – and Manuela Beata Carmen (+ 5 March 1924).

Works

 Mémoire sur la voix humaine présenté à l'Académie des Sciences en 1840. Paris: Duverger, 1847.
 Ecole de García: traité complet de l'art du chant par Manuel García fils. Mayence, Paris: Schott 1840 (Teil 1), 1847 (Teil 2).
 Tratado completo del arte del canto. Lucía Díaz Marroquín y Mario Villoria (eds.). Kassel: Reichenberger, 2012. (Annotated edition in Spanish).
 Garcías Schule oder Die Kunst des Gesanges in allen ihren Theilen vollst. abgehandelt von Manuel García. Deutscher Text von C. Wirth. Mainz: Schott, 1841; auch in zwei Teilen in der Zeitschrift Caecilia; Erster Theil, in Band 22 (1843), Heft 85; Zweiter Theil in Band 26 (1847), Heft 104 (Digitalisat)
 Ecole de García: traité complet de l'art du chant. (Band 1 und 2 zusammen). Mayence, Paris: Schott 1856.
 A complete treatise on the art of singing, part two by M. García II. Second part, complete and unabridged, the editions of 1847 and 1872 collated, ed. and transl. by Donald V. Paschke. Reprint of the 1872 edition. New York: Da Capo Press, 1975. . . (Note: Includes bibliographies).

Genealogy

References
Notes

Sources
 "Manuel Patricio García, el científico del bel canto" RTVE La 2. Documentary (3:55 min.).
 Malcolm Sterling Mackinlay: Garcia the centenarian and his times, being a memoir of Manuel Garcia's life and labours for the advancement of music and science. Edinburgh and London: Blackwood, 1908 (accessible for free online in Internet Archive; reprint: García the centenarian and his times. New York: Da Capo Pr., 1976).
 Lucía Díaz Marroquín y Mario Villoria Morillo. La práctica del canto según Manuel García. Madrid: Consejo Superior de Investigaciones Científicas, 2012 (Includes the exercises and annotated arias from the Traite complet de l'art du chant) .
 Byron Cantrell: Hints on singing by Manuel Patricio Rodríguez García. Introd. by Byron Cantrell. Canoga Park, Calif.: Summit Publ. Co., 1970. Reprint of the edition London, New York 1894 (Translated from French).
 April Fitzlyon, Garcia, Manuel (Patricio Rodriguez), in Stanley Sadie (ed): The New Grove Dictionary of Opera. New York: Grove (Oxford University Press), 1997 (II, p. 345). .

External links
 europavox.org: a website and research project devoted to the voice. Includes information on several members of the García family.
 Garcia the Centenarian And His Times, by M. Sterling Mackinley at gutenberg.org
 
 Biography/bibliography.

1805 births
1906 deaths
Spanish music educators
Spanish operatic baritones
Spanish inventors
Spanish centenarians
Academics of the Royal Academy of Music
University of Königsberg alumni
Academic staff of the Conservatoire de Paris
Spanish expatriates in Germany
Spanish expatriates in France
19th-century Spanish male opera singers
Men centenarians